Selsbakk is a neighbourhood in the city of Trondheim in Trøndelag county, Norway. It is located in the borough of Midtbyen. The local sports club is Selsbakk IF.

References

Geography of Trondheim
Neighbourhoods of Trondheim